Andrew Edward Robinson Haddock (born 5 May 1946) is a Scottish former professional footballer who played as a winger in the Football League for Chester, Crewe Alexandra, Rotherham United and Bradford Park Avenue.

References

1946 births
Living people
Footballers from Edinburgh
Association football wingers
Scottish footballers
Chester City F.C. players
Crewe Alexandra F.C. players
Falkirk F.C. players
Rotherham United F.C. players
Chelmsford City F.C. players
Bradford (Park Avenue) A.F.C. players
Fleetwood Town F.C. players
Scottish Football League players
English Football League players